"Rollin" is a song written and performed by Scottish DJ and record producer Calvin Harris featuring American rapper Future and American singer Khalid. It is the third single from Harris' fifth studio album, Funk Wav Bounces Vol. 1 (2017), following "Slide" and "Heatstroke". It was released on 12 May 2017 through Sony Music.

Critical reception
Pitchfork praised the track, saying Harris is "producing full-on swing jams like its second nature. Harris has proven to be a more than capable manager," further stating that "not only is Calvin Harris making pop funky again; he’s surpassing DJ Khaled as a pop-rap maestro."

Credits and personnel
Credits adapted from the song's liner notes.

 Calvin Harris – Production, Yamaha C7 Piano, Ibanez 1200 Bass, Roland Jupiter-8, Fender Rhodes, PPG Wave 2.2, Linn LM-2, 1965 Fender Stratocaster, ARP String Ensemble PE IV, mixing, recording
 Future – vocals
 Khalid – vocals
 Seth Firkins – recording
 Dave Kutch – mastering

Charts

Year-end charts

Certifications

Release history

References

External links
 

2017 songs
2017 singles
Calvin Harris songs
Future (rapper) songs
Khalid (singer) songs
Songs written by Calvin Harris
Songs written by Future (rapper)
Songs written by Khalid (singer)
British funk songs
Sony Music UK singles